Serafino Morazzone (1 February 1747 - 13 April 1822) was an Italian Roman Catholic priest. Morazzone served as a simple parish priest in Lecco from his ordination as a priest in 1773 until his death and became noted amongst the faithful for his personal holiness and dedication to the sacraments.

Morazzone's beatification process started in 1864 but later halted due to issues in Milan and the cause remained inactive until its revitalization in the 1950s. He was named as Venerable in 2007 and was later beatified at the Milanese Duomo on 26 June 2011.

Life
Serafino Morazzone was born in Milan in 1747 to Francesco Morazzone.

He received his education from the Jesuits. In 1760 he was vested in the cassock and in 1761 was given the tonsure; he later received two minor orders in 1764 and the other minor orders later in 1771. In 1773 he was ordained as a sub-deacon and then a deacon and was ordained to the priesthood on 9 May 1773 at the church of Santa Maria at San Satiro. Morazzone acted as a simple parish priest from his ordination until his death and served as the confessor to Alessandro Manzoni until at least 1818.

He died on 13 April 1822 and was interred in San Giovanni Battista church in Lecco. Cardinal Alfredo Ildefonso Schuster once referred to him as Milan's own "Cure of Ars".

Beatification
The beatification process opened in Milan after Archbishop Paolo Angelo Ballerini inaugurated the diocesan process in 1864 and later closed it in 1867; the cause remained inactive due to situations in Milan despite attempts to revitalize it. Theologians later approved all of Morazzone's spiritual writings on 24 May 1958 and the Congregation for the Causes of Saints later validated the informative process on 29 January 1993. Historians approved the cause on 15 December 1998 while the postulation later submitted the Positio to the C.C.S. in 1999; theologians approved it on 20 April 2007 as did the C.C.S. on 20 November 2007. Morazzone was named as Venerable on 17 December 2007 after Pope Benedict XVI confirmed his life of heroic virtue.

The process for a miracle spanned from 24 May 2005 until 21 March 2006 and received validation on 9 June 2007. A medical board approved this on 29 October 2007 as did theologians on 15 January 2011 and the C.C.S. on 1 March 2011. Benedict XVI approved this miracle on 2 April 2011 and confirmed the beatification. Cardinal Angelo Amato presided over the beatification on 26 June 2011 outside of the Milanese Duomo.

The current postulator for this cause is Francesca Consolini.

See also
 San Giovanni Battista church

References

External links
Hagiography Circle

1747 births
1822 deaths
18th-century venerated Christians
18th-century Italian Roman Catholic priests
19th-century venerated Christians
19th-century Italian Roman Catholic priests
Beatifications by Pope Benedict XVI
Italian beatified people
Clergy from Milan
Venerated Catholics by Pope Benedict XVI